Fistral Beach is in Fistral Bay (meaning cove of the foul water) on the north coast of Cornwall, England, United Kingdom.

Fistral Bay is bounded by two promontories, Towan Head to the north and Pentire Point East (not to be confused with Pentire Head) to the south.

It is backed by steep sand dunes and is overlooked by the Headland Hotel. The name "Fistral" is recorded as Fistal in 1813, coming from the Cornish bystel meaning "foul water, bile or gall" (compare Welsh bustl) probably in reference to the waves making it an unsuitable landing site.

Surfing
Fistral Beach is best known for surfing. Its west-facing aspect exposes it to Atlantic swells ensuring consistent waves suitable for surfing. The beach is the venue for major international surfing competitions and a competition suite for judges and competitors has been built at North Fistral along with a surf museum.

The British Surfing Association, Newquay Surf Life Saving Club and the Newquay Boardrider Club are all based at Fistral Beach.

The Cribbar, a reef at the north end of the beach, causes waves to break when the swell is high.

On 21 September 2006 Fistral Beach hosted the British Surfing Association's invitational Gold Rush Big Wave Competition. The winner was 28-year-old Scott Eastwood of the Channel Islands who scored a perfect 10 in the final.

The Boardmasters Festival is also held at Fistral Beach.

References

 

Newquay
Surfing locations in Cornwall
Tourist attractions in Cornwall
Beaches of Cornwall